FastStone Image Viewer is an image viewer and organizer for Microsoft Windows, provided free of charge for personal and educational use, .
The program also includes basic image editing tools.

Features
Highlights:
Relatively fast HQ image thumbnail viewing, using Lanczos resampling algorithm
Support for multi-monitor configuration
Custom order arranging, via drag-and-drop, and automatic renumbering
Batch operations including rename and convert
Color space management (partial, it ignores the monitor profile)
Magnifier lens
Portable version to be used without installation, typically installed on USB flash drive, including all user settings.
Preview of quality loss when saving in lossy file formats (such as JPEG).
If in fullscreen mode, pops up an image gallery, detailed image information, editing options, or program options at the border being touched by the mouse.

Other features include:
Supports all major graphic formats (BMP, JPEG, JPEG 2000, animated GIF, PNG, PCX, TIFF, WMF, ICO, and TGA), with a focus on popular digital camera RAW formats such as Canon's CR2 and CR3, and Sony's ARW.
Displays Exchangeable image file format (Exif) camera information
Thumbnail cache and database
Basic image editing tools: resizing, cropping, color correction, red-eye removal
Advance image editing tools: clone brush, curve (tonality), levels, and unsharp mask.
Lossless JPEG rotation and cropping
Side-by-side image comparison tool
Fully customizable contact sheet Builder*Emailing
Memory card image retriever
Slide show, including music and many transition effects
Emailing

Versions
The FastStone Image Viewer was first released in 2004 by FastStone Soft. Since then, new stable versions have been released regularly.

Since version 3.1, a multilingual version has been available, supporting Simplified and Traditional Chinese, Danish, Dutch, French, German, Hungarian, Italian, Norwegian, Polish, Portuguese, Russian, Spanish, and Swedish.

This Windows program is provided in three forms: as a normal-install executable, a zip file of the same, or as a fully portable no-install zip file.

According to FastStone, version 2.7 and all previous releases have been found to be using improperly licensed images and icons, and as a result, FastStone requested that version 2.7 and older copies of FastStone Image Viewer cease to be used, with all licenses updated to version 2.8 for both free and commercial versions. This announcement was made on their web site the same date that version 2.8 was posted.

Issues
As of version 4.2, resizing of animations (i.e. animated GIFs) is not supported. Thus they can only be viewed at 100% scale, this includes thumbnails.
When the program starts, a delay may occur as the thumbnail view is managed, more so the first time when the thumbnail cache database is built.
The portable version (from PortableApps) sometimes has problems saving its settings, ignoring them at random. Quitting and restarting the app (not PortableApps or the underlying OS) usually solves this problem.

See also
Comparison of image viewers
IrfanView
XnView

External links

Shortcuts v 4.3 (German PDF)
Features in Faststone Image Viewer 

Image organizers
Pascal (programming language) software
Windows multimedia software
Windows-only software
2004 software